Nicolas Arrossamena (born January 9, 1990) is a French professional ice hockey forward who plays for Anglet Hormadi Élite of the Ligue Magnus.

Arrossamena played for France at the 2011 IIHF World Championship.

References

External links

1990 births
Living people
Anglet Hormadi Élite players
Brûleurs de Loups players
Dauphins d'Épinal players
Dragons de Rouen players
Ducs d'Angers players
French ice hockey forwards
People from Saint Pierre and Miquelon
Rapaces de Gap players